Knut Billing (15 January 1939 – 31 May 2007) was a Swedish politician, member of the Swedish Riksdag 1979–2002. He was a member of the Housing Committee in 1983, and later in 1994 until 2002 as Speaker for the committee. He was also a member of the Swedish delegation to the Council of Europe from October 1993 until December 2002. He was also a member of Sweden's Nominating Committee from February 1992 until September 2002. During his time in the Riksdag, Billing was serving the constituency of Stockholm County.

References 

1939 births
2007 deaths
Members of the Riksdag from the Moderate Party
Members of the Riksdag 1979–1982
Members of the Riksdag 1982–1985
Members of the Riksdag 1985–1988
Members of the Riksdag 1988–1991
Members of the Riksdag 1991–1994
Members of the Riksdag 1994–1998
Members of the Riksdag 1998–2002